The 2010–11 season is Persipura Jayapura's 3rd season in the Indonesia Super League. Persipura will try to win their second trophy in three seasons, competing in the Super League, the AFC Cup, and the Indonesia Cup.

Key events
 1 July: Striker Qu Cheng leave Persipura after failing to agree contract extensions.
 10 July: Persipura confirm the signing of Liberia Midfielder Zah Rahan on a "short-term contract for an undisclosed fee" from Sriwijaya.
 2 August: Erol Iba joins Persebaya 1927 on a free transfer.
 8 August: Striker Titus Bonay joins Persipura on a free transfer from Persiram on a "short-term contract".
 18 August: Defender Hamka Hamzah joins Persipura on a free transfer from Persisam on a "short-term contract".
 18 August: Goalkeeper Yandri Pitoy leaves Persipura after spending five years to join Perseman.
 18 August: Defender Edison Ames joins Persidafon for an undisclosed fee after spending three years at Persipura.
 23 August: Defender Steven Hendambo joins Persipura on a free transfer from Persiba on a "short-term contract".
 31 August: Captain Eduard Ivakdalam leave Persipura after spending 16 years with stunning won two championships in the seasons 2005 and 2008-09, and he joins Persidafon on a free transfer.
 17 September: Persipura confirm the signing of Korea Goalkeeper Yoo Jae-Hun from Daejeon on a free transfer.
 17 September: Goalkeeper Eki Sabilillah joins Persipura from Persebaya on a free transfer on a "short-term contract".
 22 September: Defender Yohanis Tjoe joins Persipura on a free transfer from Pro Titan on a "short-term contract".
 7 December: In drawing Persipura enter into Group H together with South China, Chonburi and East Bengal in the event 2011 AFC Cup.
 5 January: Indonesia U-23 call-up five player from Persipura namely David Laly, Imanuel Wanggai, Lukas Mandowen, Stevie Bonsapia and Titus Bonay for 2012 Olympic qualification and preparation for the 2011 SEA Games.
 17 January: Persipura take over again top of the league from Semen Padang.
 17 January: Two young players Persipura David Laly and Titus Bonay passed the national team that will compete in the Pre Olympics.
 6 February: Persipura suffered his first defeat this season obtained from Arema FC with the score 1-0.
 2 March: Persipura started his struggle in the 2011 AFC Cup against South China.
 16 March: Persipura produced a dominant performance to claim three points from their AFC Cup Group H clash with East Bengal at Gelora Bung Karno.
 28 March: AFC has approved the use of Mandala Stadium in Jayapura, Indonesia, as Persipura Jayapura’s home venue for their remaining AFC Cup group matches.
 13 April: Persipura ensured the first-ever continental game at Mandala Stadium will be remembered for some time to come after they downed Chonburi 3-0.
 13 April: Persipura coach Jacksen Tiago was ecstatic to see his side come out on top in the first-ever continental game played at Mandala Stadium after the Indonesians beat Chonburi 3-0 to go top of AFC Cup Group H.
 18 April: Persipura establish itself at the top of the Indonesia Super League standings after successfully overthrowing Persiba Balikpapan at the Mandala Stadium, Jayapura, Monday, April 18 evening.
 26 April: Pipob On-Mo scored twice as Chonburi moved to the top of Group H in the AFC Cup with a 4-1 win over Persipura Jayapura on Tuesday, a scoreline that easily could have been more emphatic.
 26 April: Chonburi may have boosted their chances of reaching the last 16 in the AFC Cup with an emphatic 4-1 win over Group H leaders Persipura Jayapura at Chonburi PE Stadium but boss Withaya Laohakul was still not completely satisfied with his side's performance.
 3 May: Perispura booked their place in the last 16 of the AFC Cup as Boas Solossa's double secured a 4-2 win over South China at Mandala Stadium.
 3 May: Persipura boss Jacksen Tiago praised his players for executing his plans to the letter as they beat South China 4-2 to book their place in the last 16 of the AFC Cup.
 10 May: East Bengal came from behind to earn a share of the spoils against Persipura with a 1-1 draw in their concluding Group H AFC Cup match that sees the Indonesians finish second in the table following Chonburi's 3-0 victory at South China.
 10 May: Persipura coach Jacksen Tiago was left to rue his team’s inability to kill off the game in the first half as the visitors had to settle for a 1-1 draw against East Bengal in their concluding Group H AFC Cup clash on Tuesday.
 25 May: Goals from Boaz and Ortizan Solossa sandwiched a strike from Titus Bonai as Persipura reached the quarter-finals of the AFC Cup with a 3-1 win at Song Lam Nghe An.
 25 May: Persipura boss Jacksen Tiago was delighted his side could end their poor away form in the AFC Cup and secure a place in the last eight following a 3-1 win over Song Lam Nghe An at Vinh Stadium.
 31 May: Persipura has come closer to Indonesia Super League title this season after successfully defeating host Persela with the score 1-0 at the Surajaya Stadium on Tuesday.
 7 June: West Asian teams will aim to maintain their stranglehold on the AFC Cup trophy as four teams from the region discovered the identity of their opponents in the quarter-final stage on Tuesday.
 8 June: Persipura ultimately ensure themselves a champion 2010-11 Indonesia Super League after they conquered Persisam Putra Samarinda 2-1 in Segiri Stadium, on Wednesday, 8 June.
 19 June: Feast of a thousand fireworks at Mandala Stadium, Jayapura, coloring the atmosphere of joy after the PT Liga Indonesia championship trophy handed to the team Persipura Jayapura, which became the winner of Indonesia Super League.
 29 June: After winning the title Indonesia Super League (ISL) season 2010-2011, Persipura extend the glory by beating the All Stars 2-1 (1-1) in the 2011 All-Star Games that took place at the Mandala Stadium, Jayapura, on Wednesday (29 / 6).

Players

Squad information

Reserve squad

Transfers

In

First team

Reserve team

Out

First team

Reserve team

Squad statistics

Appearances and goals
Statistics accurate as of match played 19 June 2011

* = Lent to the team Persipura U-21.

Scorers

All

League

AFC Cup

Indonesia Cup

As of games played 19 June 2011

Disciplinary record

Club

Coaching staff

Kit
The 2010–11 Persipura home and away kit was confirmed on 3 March 2011.

|
|

Other information

Competitions

Overall

Last updated: 19 June 2011Source: Competitions' Wikipedia articles.

Super League

Standings

Results summary

Matches

Last updated: 20 June 2011Source: Persipura Jayapura

All-Star Games

Last updated: 29 June 2011Source: Persipura Jayapura

AFC Cup

Group stage

Source:

Knockout phase

Round of 16

Quarter-finals

Updated to games played on 25 May 2011
Source: AFC Cup Schedule & Results

Indonesia Cup
Competition not held.

Last updated: 10 May 2011Source: Persipura Jayapura

See also
 2011 AFC Cup
 2010–11 Indonesia Super League
 2011 Piala Indonesia
 2011 Indonesia Super League All-Star Game

References

External links
 Fans Official Site
 Persipura Jayapura not Official Site
 AFC Cup Official Page

Persipura Jayapura seasons
Persipura Jayapura